Alexandru Victorio Pițurcă (born 28 October 1983) is a retired Romanian footballer.

Career
Alexandru Pițurcă started his career under the guidance of his father, Victor Pițurcă at Steaua București, making his Divizia A debut on 13 June 2001 in a 3–3 in which he scored a goal against Argeș Pitești. He was loaned in 2003 at 2. Bundesliga team Jahn Regensburg, but did not play there. From 2004 until 2006 he spent two seasons in Divizia B at FC Caracal and Universitatea Craiova, helping the latter win promotion to Divizia A. In 2006 Pițurcă signed with CSKA Sofia, where he played alongside fellow Romanians Florentin Petre and Eugen Trică. In the following years he went to play for Pandurii Târgu Jiu, FC Brașov and Universitatea Craiova, having a total of 100 Divizia A appearances in which he scored 15 goals, he also has two games played in the 2001–02 Champions League. Pițurcă retired in 2011 at age 27, after playing in Azerbaijan at Khazar Lankaran under coach Mircea Rednic.

Personal life
His father, Victor Pițurcă was a footballer and a coach.

Honours
Steaua București
Divizia A: 2000–01
Supercupa României: 2001
Universitatea Craiova
Divizia B: 2005–06
Khazar Lankaran
Azerbaijan Cup: 2010–11

References

External links
 
 

1983 births
Living people
Romanian footballers
Association football forwards
FC Steaua București players
FC U Craiova 1948 players
CS Pandurii Târgu Jiu players
FC Brașov (1936) players
SSV Jahn Regensburg players
PFC CSKA Sofia players
Khazar Lankaran FK players
Romanian expatriate footballers
Expatriate footballers in Germany
Expatriate footballers in Bulgaria
Romanian expatriate sportspeople in Bulgaria
Expatriate footballers in Azerbaijan
Liga I players
Liga II players
First Professional Football League (Bulgaria) players